An Byeong-jik (born 1936) or Ahn Byong-jick is a Professor Emeritus at Seoul National University and a co-founder of the Naksungdae Institute of Economic Research. He is the representative director of the New Right Foundation. His research focuses on economic history during the Korea under Japanese rule.

He disclosed a diary by a manager of World War II Japanese military brothels and published a book called Diary of a Japanese Military Brothel Manager in 2013.

Academic career
An was born in Haman in 1936. He was graduated from Department of Economics, Seoul University. He received a master's degree in economics. He became a professor of Seoul National University College of Social Sciences. He was appointed a professor emeritus at Seoul National University in 2001.

Works

See also
New Right (South Korea)
Park Yu-ha
Lee Young-hoon

References

External links
 Naksungdae Institute of Economic Research in Korean

Living people
South Korean historians
Academic staff of Seoul National University
1936 births
People from Haman County
Comfort women